The Royal Bowling Center is a bowling alley located in Seoul, South Korea. It hosted the bowling demonstration events during the 1988 Summer Olympics.

References
1988 Summer Olympics official report. Volume 1. Part 1. p. 206.

Venues of the 1988 Summer Olympics
Indoor arenas in South Korea
Sports venues in Seoul